Calatayud is a Spanish Denominación de Origen Protegida (DOP) for wines located in the southwestern corner of the province of Zaragoza (Aragón, Spain) about 90 km from Zaragoza and covers over 5,600 ha, extending over 46 different municipalities, including Calatayud itself. It borders with the Cariñena (DO) in the east and with the province of Soria in the west. It is in the Ebro River valley and is crisscrossed by many of the Ebro's tributaries including the Jalón, Jiloca, Manubles, Mesa (river), Piedra and Ribota. The vineyards are found on the south facing slopes of the Sierra de la Virgen range at heights of between 550 m and 800 m above sea level.

Climate
The climate is continental (hot dry summers and cold winters), the mean annual temperature does not exceed 13 °C, and there is a good probability of frost during six months of the year. The mean annual rainfall is between 300 mm and 500 mm per annum.

Soils
Most of the vines are planted in soils that are stoney, loose, very poor in nutrients and with a high lime content. The permeability is good so the roots are able to obtain the water and nutrients they require.

Authorised Grape varieties
The authorised grape varieties are:

 Red: Garnacha Tinta, Tempranillo, Mazuela, Monastrell, Cabernet Sauvignon, Merlot, Bobal, and Syrah

 White: Macabeo, Malvasía, Moscatel de Alejandría, Garnacha Blanca, Chardonnay, Sauvignon Blanc, and Gewürztraminer

References

External links
 DOP Calatayud official website

Wine regions of Spain
Spanish wine
Appellations
Wine classification
Calatayud
Geography of the Province of Zaragoza
Aragonese cuisine